UCL Observatory (called the University of London Observatory until 2015) at Mill Hill in London is an astronomical teaching observatory. It is part of the Department of Physics and Astronomy at University College London.

History 
The Observatory was opened, as the University of London Observatory, on 8 October 1929 by the then Astronomer Royal Frank Watson Dyson, initially to house the 24-inch reflector built by Grubb of Dublin in 1881 and housed in  Dr W.E. Wilson's observatory at Daramona, County Westmeath, Ireland, which was donated to the University of London after his death.

An 8-inch refractor was installed in 1931 following its donation to the University by H.R. Fry of Barnett the previous year, and was named after him. In 1932, the University received a 6-inch refractor telescope from the estate of Mr. John Joynson of Liverpool. Although originally housed in the North dome in the Bloomsbury campus main quad, it was later relocated to the Observatory. In July 1938, the Observatory was further expanded to accommodate the 24-inch/18-inch twin refractor that had been removed from the Radcliffe Observatory at Oxford in 1934.

In 1951, UCL took over management of the Observatory from the University of London, and over the next ten years added library, lecture, and laboratory space. The administrative handover was recognised in a formal renaming from the University of London Observatory (ULO) to UCL Observatory (UCLO) in October 2015, over sixty years later.

In 1965, the Observatory purchased a nearby house at 33-35 Daws Lane to serve as an Annexe hosting additional office and laboratory space, including a Lunar research group led by Gilbert Fielder. Having slowly migrated to the main Bloomsbury campus and the Mullard Space Science Laboratory since the merger of the Astronomy and Physics departments in 1972, all planetary science researched ceased at the Observatory after the Annexe was sold in 1999.

The Wilson telescope was retired in 1974 (to the Merseyside Museums), and was replaced the following year with a new 24-inch Ritchey-Chrétien Cassegrain reflector which was named after the former director of the Observatory, Professor C.W. Allen.

In 1981, the Joynson telescope, which had been installed under the floor of the Radcliffe's dome, was refurbished. From 1982 to 1997, the 8-inch Fry telescope was decommissioned for extensive refurbishment, being reinstalled in a new building that later housed new Celestron 14-inch telescopes acquired in 2006 (East dome) and 2009 (West dome). During the Fry's refurbishment, the 6-inch Joynson telescope was installed on its berth. The Joynson telescope is now no longer available for use.

In January 2013, the Observatory was affiliated with the Worshipful Company of Clockmakers.

Current Status 
In addition to the Fry, Radcliffe, and Allen telescopes, two Celestron 14-inch Schmidt-Cassegrain telescopes are housed in permanent domes, and there are several smaller free-standing telescopes.

After 13 years of fund-raising efforts, a new ASTELCO 80 cm Ritchey–Chrétien telescope is planned to be installed on site in the Summer of 2018. This will replace the Allen telescope, and become the facility's biggest telescope.

The observatory's primary purpose is to provide UCL undergraduates with training in practical astrophysical techniques and data-handling.
There is also a research programme, involving students in observing transits of extrasolar planets.

SN2014J 
On 21 January 2014 supernova SN2014J was discovered at the observatory by astronomer Steve Fossey during a session with four undergraduate students.

Gallery

References 

 UCL Observatory
 William Edward Wilson and the Story of Daramona
 the University of London's Mill Hill Observatory

Astronomical observatories in England
Observatory
Science and technology in London
Mill Hill